Myx Music Awards 2013 is the 8th Myx music awards since it started in 2006. Rapper Gloc-9 has the most number of nominations with 8 from 7 different categories. Availing of nominees happened on the February 18, 2013, while awards night shall happen on the 20th day of March 2013. Both events (nomination special and awards night) are available online thru Myx's live stream. And just like the Myx Music Awards 2012, fans can vote online through Myx's official website, Twitter and Facebook.

Nominees and winners
With the most number of nominations, Gloc-9 is also the biggest winner of the Myx Music Awards 2013 in terms of number of awards received with 3 including Favorite Song.

Winners are in bold text

Favorite Music Video 
"12:51" – Krissy and Ericka (Director: Nani Naguit) 
"Gayuma" – Abra feat. Thyro and Jeriko Aguilar (Director: Abra, Cristhian Escolano, Jasper Salimbangon)
"Pag-Ibig" – Yeng Constantino (Director: Mackie Galvez)
"Sige Lang" – Quest (Director: Nolan Bernardino)
"Sirena" – Gloc-9 feat. Ebe Dancel (Director: J. Pacena II)

Favorite Song
"12:51" – Krissy and Ericka
"I'll Be There" – Julie Anne San Jose
"Moving Closer" – Never The Strangers 
"Sige Lang" – Quest
"Sirena" – Gloc-9 feat. Ebe Dancel

Favorite Artist
Callalily
Christian Bautista
Gloc-9
Sarah Geronimo
Yeng Constantino

Favorite Female Artist 
Angeline Quinto
Julie Anne San Jose
Sarah Geronimo
Yeng Constantino
Zia Quizon

Favorite Male Artist
Abra
Bamboo
Christian Bautista
Gloc-9
Rico Blanco

Favorite Group
Callalily
Kamikazee
Krissy and Ericka
Never The Strangers
Sponge Cola

Favorite Mellow Video
"12:51" – Krissy and Ericka (Director: Nani Naguit)
"Bakit Mahal Pa Rin Kita" – Erik Santos (Director: Nani Naguit)
"Dear Lonely" – Zia Quizon (Director: Nani Naguit)
"I'll Be There" – Julie Anne San Jose (Director: Mark Reyes)
"In Love With You" – Christian Bautista and Angeline Quinto (Director: Treb Monteras II)

Favorite Rock Video
"Amats" – Rico Blanco (Director: Marla Ancheta, Rico Blanco)
"Huling Sayaw" – Kamikazee feat. Kyla (Director: Avid Liongoren)
"Ikot Ng Mundo" – Bamboo (Director: Treb Monteras II)
"Reverend's Daughter" – Typecast  (Director: Pedring Lopez)
"Sandata" – Wolfgang (Director: Nolan Bernardino)

Favorite Urban Video
"Gayuma" – Abra feat. Thyro and Jeriko Aguilar (Director: Abra, Cristhian Escolano, Jasper Salimbangon)
"Sige Lang" -Quest (Director: Nolan Bernardino)
"Sirena" – Gloc-9 feat. Ebe Dancel (Director: J. Pacena II)
"Tao Lang" – Loonie feat. Quest (Director: Cristhian Escolano)
"Your Name" – Young JV feat. Myrtle (Director: Nolan Bernardino)

Favorite New Artist
Abra
Daniel Padilla
Julie Anne San Jose
Never The Strangers
Robin Nievera

Favorite Collaboration
"Bakit Hindi" – Gloc-9 feat. Billy Crawford
"Huling Sayaw" – Kamikazee feat. Kyla
"In Love With You" – Christian Bautista and Angeline Quinto
"Sirena" – Gloc-9 feat. Ebe Dancel
"XGF" – Sponge Cola feat. Chito Miranda and Los Magno

Favorite Remake
"Bakit Pa Ba" – Sarah Geronimo (original:Jay-R)
"Minsan" – Callalily (original:Eraserheads)
"Prinsesa" – Daniel Padilla (original:The Teeth)
"Urong Sulong" – Bea Binene (original:Regine Velasquez)
"Your Love" – Paulo Avelino (original:Alamid)

Favorite Media Soundtrack
"Minsan" (The Reunion) – Callalily
"Moving Closer" (Close-Up) – Never The Strangers
"Nag-Iisang Bituin" (Princess and I) – Christian Bautista
"Tuloy" (Coca-Cola) – Sarah Geronimo, Somedaydream and Gary Valenciano
"Hanggang Sa Dulo Ng Walang Hanggan" (Walang Hanggan) – Gary Valenciano

Favorite Guest Appearance In A Music Video
Alodia Gosiengfiao ("Hey Hey Alodia" – Segatron)
Anne Curtis ("XGF" – Sponge Cola feat. Chito Miranda and Los Magno)
Elmo Magalona ("I'll Be There" – Julie Anne San Jose)
Marian Rivera ("My Everything" – Down To Mars)
Slater Young ("Bakit Ba Minamahal Kita" – Angeline Quinto)

Favorite Myx Celebrity VJ
Bea Binene
Daniel Padilla
Julie Anne San Jose
Paulo Avelino 
Xian Lim

Favorite Myx Live! Performance
Aiza Seguerra
Christian Bautista
Gloc-9
Kamikazee
Noel Cabangon

Favorite International Video
 "One Thing" – One Direction
 "Boyfriend" – Justin Bieber
 "Part Of Me" – Katy Perry
 "Payphone" – Maroon 5 feat. Wiz Khalifa
 "We Are Never Getting Back Together" – Taylor Swift

Favorite K-Pop Video
"Mama (Exo song)" – EXO
"Sherlock (Clue + Note)" – Shinee
"Severely (song)" – F.T. Island
"Sexy, Free & Single" – Super Junior
"Twinkle" – Girls' Generation-TTS

Myx Magna Award
Lea Salonga

References

External links
 Myx official site

Philippine music awards